Desulfovibrio marinisediminis is a bacterium. It is sulfate-reducing. Its cells are vibrio-shaped, Gram-negative, motile rods (0.7-1.0 micrometres wide and 1.0-3.5 micrometres long) with single polar flagella. The type strain is C/L2(T) (=NBRC [corrected] 101113(T) =JCM 14577(T) =DSM 17456(T)).

References

Further reading
Staley, James T., et al. "Bergey's manual of systematic bacteriology, vol. 3."Williams and Wilkins, Baltimore, MD (1989): 2250–2251. *Bélaich, Jean-Pierre, Mireille Bruschi, and Jean-Louis Garcia, eds. Microbiology and biochemistry of strict Anaerobes Involved in interspecies hydrogen transfer. No. 54. Springer, 1990.

External links
LPSN

WORMS entry
Type strain of Desulfovibrio marinisediminis at BacDive -  the Bacterial Diversity Metadatabase

Bacteria described in 2008
Desulfovibrio